Atlanta Pride, also colloquially (and formerly) called the Atlanta Gay Pride Festival, is a week-long annual lesbian, gay, bisexual, transgender (LGBT) pride festival held in Atlanta, Georgia (United States). Established in 1971, it is one of the oldest and largest pride festivals in the United States. According to the Atlanta Pride Committee, as of 2017, attendance had continually grown to around 300,000. Originally a pride held in June, Atlanta Pride has been held in October every year since 2008, typically on a weekend closest to National Coming Out Day.

Background 

The annual pride week began when a group of lesbian, gay men, drag queens, and gender non-conformists joined together. At the time police raids on gay bars were common because homosexual sex was illegal in all but one state in the United States.[3] On June 28, 1969, the police raided a popular gay bar called Stonewall Inn. Everyone was cooperative until the police began to force three drag queens and a lesbian into the back of a police car. The crowd of bystanders began to throw bottles at the police and fight back. This riot later became known as the Stonewall riot. The riot lasted for several days and began one of the first equal rights protests for the LGBT community.[4] That riot was the beginning of the LGBT rights movements and the opportunity and gateway for Atlanta Pride.

In 1970, a year after the Stonewall riots, Atlanta activists handed out literature at an arts festival in Piedmont Park. During the city's first Pride protest march in 1971, activists were not granted a permit to march; the march took place on sidewalks from Downtown to Piedmont Park. In 1972, hundreds of people marched in the parade, which was covered by local television stations. In 1973, some marchers wore paper bags over their heads to hide their identity, protecting themselves from the dangers they may face and to represent how invisible they felt in their communities.[5]

Since 2010, the event has had an annual economic impact of over $25 million for the city.

In 2016, Pride.com named Atlanta Pride one of the eight best LGBT pride events in the nation.

Held in October to coincide with "National Coming Out Day," the Atlanta Pride festival is preceded by a variety of events that begin in June to celebrate the Stonewall riots. Each year, the Atlanta Pride Committee names Grand Marshals, including Stacey Abrams and Feroza Syed in 2019. Atlanta's Out on Film gay film festival offers a weeklong selection of LGBT films by, for, and about the LGBT community. Out on Film runs in conjunction with Atlanta Pride.

Location 
Until 2008, it was held in June in Piedmont Park in Midtown Atlanta. In 2008, large events were banned from Piedmont Park due to drought conditions, so Pride was moved to the Atlanta Civic Center and delayed until October. In 2009, it returned to Piedmont Park, but kept the October date due to more favorable autumn weather and the difficulty to perform adequate fundraising in only nine months.

Atlanta is widely noted as the LGBT capital of the South due to its progressive reputation, highly visible and diverse LGBT community, and vibrant LGBT culture. In 2010, The Advocate named Atlanta the "gayest city in America." In 2019, Realtor.com ranked Atlanta the second best city in America for LGBTQ residents.

Events 
"The main mission of the Atlanta Pride Committee is to provide lesbians, gay men, bisexuals, and transgender and queer persons with cultural and educational programs and activities which enhance mental and physical health, provide social support, and foster an awareness of the past and present contributions of lesbians, gay men, bisexuals and transgender persons, through community activities and services, including an annual Pride event."[1] The events that occur at Atlanta Pride range from speeches about violence against women, race, sexual orientation, gender, immigration, etc. The main event is the pride parade which is a march through the city filled with costumes, music, and banners.[2] It also has marches, market layout and vendors, concerts, dance parties, motorcycle shows, and cultural exhibits.

See also
Atlanta Black Pride
Atlanta Gay Center
Ansley Mall
Atlanta Gay Men's Chorus
Cheshire Bridge Road
Georgia Equality
LGBT rights in Georgia (U.S. state)
My Sister's Room

References

External links
Atlanta Pride — official website

Festivals in Atlanta
Pride parades in Georgia (U.S. state)
LGBT culture in Atlanta
1971 establishments in Georgia (U.S. state)
Recurring events established in 1971